The 3rd Infantry Brigade Combat Team is an infantry brigade based at Fort Knox, Kentucky. The brigade is a subordinate unit of 1st Infantry Division.

History
The 3rd Brigade Combat Team, 1st Infantry Division, since it was constituted, has been organized, reorganized, Inactivated, disbanded, reconstituted, and redesignated several times.

Constituted 24 May 1917 in the Regular Army as Headquarters Troop, 1st Expeditionary Division
Organized 8 June 1917 at New York, New York
Reorganized and redesignated 6 July 1917 as Headquarters Troop, 1st Division
Reorganized and redesignated 13 February 1921 as Headquarters and Military Police Company (less Military Police Platoon), 1st Division
Reorganized and redesignated 1 August 1942 as Headquarters Company, 1st Infantry Division
Disbanded 20 April 1960 at Fort Riley, Kansas
Reconstituted 23 October 1963 in the Regular Army as Headquarters and Headquarters Company, 3rd Brigade, 1st Infantry Division
Activated 2 January 1964 at Fort Riley, Kansas
Redesignated 21 July 1975 as Headquarters and Headquarters Company, 1st Infantry Division Forward
Inactivated 15 August 1991 in Germany
Redesignated 16 February 1996 as Headquarters and Headquarters Company, 3d Brigade, 1st Infantry Division, and activated in Germany
Headquarters, 3rd Brigade, 1st Infantry Division, reorganized and redesignated 16 April 2007 as Headquarters, 3d Brigade Combat Team, 1st Infantry Division (Headquarters Company, 3d Brigade, 1st Infantry Division – hereafter separate lineage)
Inactivation Ceremony at Fort Knox, KY - 21 May 2014
Reactivated

Organization
The unit is composed of:
Headquarters & Headquarters Company (HHC) ("Hellfighters")
 Special Troops Battalion (STB) ("Valiant Warrior")
2nd Battalion, 63rd Armor Regiment ("Lions")
2nd Battalion, 2nd Infantry Regiment ("Ramrods")
1st Battalion, 26th Infantry Regiment ("Blue Spaders")
6th Squadron, 4th Cavalry Regiment ("Raiders")
1st Battalion, 6th Field Artillery Regiment (1-6th FAR) ("Centaurs")
201st Brigade Support Battalion (201st BSB) ("Thor")

References

Further reading
The Brigade, A History by John J. McGrath from the Combat Studies Institute Press, Fort Leavenworth, Kansas.

External links
Official 3/1 IBCT Facebook Page: 

Infantry 001 03
Infantry 001 03
Military units and formations established in 1963
Military units and formations disestablished in 2014